is a Japanese singer, actor and dancer who is a member of the group AAA.

Discography

Albums

Singles

Guest appearances

Filmography

TV series

Theater plays

Miscellaneous

References

External links 
 Official AAA profile (Japanese)
 shuta shueyoshi on Twitter

1986 births
Living people
Japanese male singers
21st-century Japanese male actors
Japanese male dancers
Japanese male musical theatre actors
Japanese male stage actors
Japanese male television actors
People from Nagasaki